Matt Leber is an American politician of the Republican Party. He is the member of the South Carolina House of Representatives representing District 116. In the 2022 general election for South Carolina House of Representatives District 116, he defeated Democratic incumbent Chardale Murray  who had been a member of the South Carolina House since 2020. Leber serves on the House Judiciary Committee.

Leber supports term limits.

Statements were issued by Henry McMaster, Governor of South Carolina who won his re-election bid, and Drew McKissick, chair of the South Carolina Republican Party.

In 2023, Leber was briefly among the Republican co-sponsors of the South Carolina Prenatal Equal Protection Act of 2023, which would make women who had abortions eligible for the death penalty; he later withdrew his sponsorship, telling NBC News "I wouldn't want to prosecute or charge women at all, that's never been my philosophy on pro-life issues... It was my intention to offer amendments. Clean it up. I'm very clear that the current language [in] this bill is not what I stand for".

References

Members of the South Carolina General Assembly
2022 South Carolina elections
South Carolina House of Representatives elections
Year of birth missing (living people)
Living people